Andy Bell (born 1963) is a British journalist and Political Editor employed by ITN's Five News since April 1999. Ten years prior to this, he worked for the BBC as their Foreign Affairs Editor of the Today programme. Bell was also  their Paris Correspondent.

He is married to Angela Bell. They have three children.

References 

Living people
5 News presenters and reporters
1963 births